Drymaeus laticinctus is a species of  tropical air-breathing land snail, a pulmonate gastropod mollusk in the family Bulimulidae.

Distribution 
Drymaeus laticinctus is endemic to Dominica. This appears to be a relatively rare species, only observed in some isolated localities.

Description 
There are spirally banded and unicoloured forms. In collections the colour of the latter usually fades away and becomes white, as already observed by Henry Augustus Pilsbry (1899). His variety dominicanus of Drymaeus virginalis – a mainland taxon – appears a white specimen. This species is part of the Drymaeus multifasciatus species complex, of which a revision is pending (Breure, in preparation).

Ecology 
Live animals were collected among fallen leaves and detritus on the ground.

References
This article incorporates CC-BY-3.0 text from the reference

External links 

Drymaeus
Endemic fauna of Dominica
Gastropods described in 1868